Delphine Forest was born in Paris, August 28, 1966, and was a French actress. She appeared in more than ten films, beginning in 1988. She died in Paris of cancer, January 31, 2020.

Selected filmography

References

External links 
 

1966 births
2020 deaths
French film actresses
Actresses from Paris